The Waynflete Professorships are four professorial fellowships at the University of Oxford endowed by Magdalen College and named in honour of the college founder William of Waynflete, who had a great interest in science. These professorships are statutory professorships of the University, that is, they are professorships established in the university's regulations, and which are by those regulations attached to Magdalen College in particular. The oldest professorship is the Waynflete Professor of Metaphysical Philosophy. The three science professorships were created following the recommendation of the University Commission in 1857, in recognition of William of Waynflete's lifetime support of science. The professorships are the Waynflete Professor of Chemistry, the Waynflete Professor of Physiology, and the Waynflete Professor of Pure Mathematics.

Waynflete Professors of Metaphysical Philosophy
This Waynflete Professorship is one of five statutory professorships in philosophy at the University of Oxford, the other four being the Wykeham Professorship in Logic, the White’s Professorship of Moral Philosophy, the Wilde Professor of Mental Philosophy, as well as the untitled professorship in Ancient Philosophy.

Currently incomplete

1859–1867 Henry Longueville Mansel
1867–1889 Henry William Chandler
1889–1910 Thomas Case
1910–1936 John Alexander Smith
1936–1941 Robin G. Collingwood
1945–1967 Gilbert Ryle
1968–1987 P. F. Strawson
1989–2000 Christopher Peacocke
2003–2006 Dorothy Edgington
2006–2015 John Hawthorne
2016– Ofra Magidor

Waynflete Professors of Chemistry 

The four heads of the Dyson Perrins Laboratory were four consecutive Waynflete Professors of Chemistry, from its foundation in 1916 as the University's research centre for organic chemistry to its relocation in 2003.

1865–1872 Sir Benjamin Collins Brodie, 2nd Baronet
1872–1912 William Odling
1912–1930 William Henry Perkin, Jr., first head of Dyson Perrins Laboratory;
1930–1954 Sir Robert Robinson
1954–1978 Ewart Jones
1978–2005 Sir Jack Baldwin, last head of Dyson Perrins Laboratory;
2006–2021 Stephen G. Davies, ex-Chairman of Chemistry.
2022– Véronique Gouverneur, from 1st November

Waynflete Professors of Physiology 

1882–1905 John Scott Burdon-Sanderson
1905–1913 Francis Gotch
1913–1935 Charles Scott Sherrington
1936–1939 John Mellanby
1940–1960 Edward George Tandy Liddell
1960–1967 George Lindor Brown
1968–1979 David Whitteridge
1979–2007 Colin Blakemore
2007– Gero Miesenböck

Waynflete Professors of Pure Mathematics 

1892–1921 Edwin Bailey Elliott
1922–1945 Arthur Lee Dixon
1947–1960 J. H. C. Whitehead
1960–1984 Graham Higman
1984–2006 Daniel Quillen
2007–2013 Raphaël Rouquier
2013– Ben Green

Notes 

1857 establishments in England
Professorships at the University of Oxford
Magdalen College, Oxford
Lists of people associated with the University of Oxford